Konkal is a panchayat village in the southern state of Karnataka, India. Administratively, Konkal is under Yadgir Taluka of Yadgir District in Karnataka.  The village of Konkal is 5 km by road south of the village of Chinakhar, and 6 km by road east of the village of Yelahar.  The nearest railhead is in Yadgir.

There are three villages in the gram panchayat: Konkal, Devanalli, and Nandepalli.

Demographics 
 census, the village of Konkal had 4,214 inhabitants, with 2,074 males and 2,140 females.

Notes

External links 
 

Villages in Yadgir district